Sonus: Journal of Investigation Into Global Musical Possibilities is a peer-reviewed academic journal that covers musicology, music education, composition, theory, journalism, ethnomusicology, and other areas of the music and performing arts. It was co-founded in the fall of 1980 by American composer and music theorist Pozzi (Olga) Escot, who, since then, has been its editor-in-chief.

References 

Publications established in 1980
Music journals
Musicology
Biannual journals
English-language journals